Cheirostylis notialis, commonly known as the southern fleshy jewel orchid, is a species of orchid that is endemic to eastern Australia where it grows in shady places in wet forest. It has between three and six egg-shaped leaves and up to four small flowers that open only slowly or not at all. It is differs from C. ovata in having smaller leaves and smaller often cleistogamous flowers.

Description 
The lateral sepals are a similar size to the dorsal sepal and the petals are the same length but about half as wide. The tip of the labellum has two lobes with toothed edges. Flowering occurs from October to November.

Taxonomy and naming
Cheirostylis notialis was first formally described in 1997 by D.L.Jones from a specimen collected near Broken in northern New South Wales. The specific epithet (notialis) is a Latin word meaning "southern", referring to the distribution of this species.

Distribution and habitat
The southern fleshy jewel orchid grows in wet forest and rainforest between the Miriam Vale in south-eastern Queensland and near Scotts Head in New South Wales.

References

Orchids of New South Wales
Orchids of Queensland
Endemic orchids of Australia
Plants described in 1997
notialis